| native_name_lang = ja
| birth_name       =
| alias            =
| birth_date       = 
| death_date       =
| origin           = Kawanishi, Hyōgo, Japan
| instrument       = Vocals, guitar
| genre            = Pop, folk
| occupation       = Singer-songwriter
| years_active     = 2004–present
| label            = Bellwood (2004)King Records (2005–present)
| associated_acts  = Depapepe, Janis Ian, Kakashi, Takuya Ōhashi (Sukima Switch), Kotaro Oshio, Spitz, Sandi Thom, Toku, Junko Yamamoto
| website          = 
}}

, known professionally as Ka-Na, is a Japanese singer-songwriter, who debuted in 2004. She is best known for her song "Toilet no Kamisama", an acoustic ballad about her grandmother, which became a hit in 2010.

Biography 
Uemura first became interested in music, after watching Julie Andrews performance in the 1965 film The Sound of Music. In 2002, she started learning the guitar, as well as writing her own songs and doing street performances.

Discography

Studio albums

Self-cover album

Extended plays

Singles

References

External links 
 Official site 
 King Records label site 
 Official blog 
 Former official blog 

1983 births
Japanese women pop singers
Japanese women singer-songwriters
Japanese singer-songwriters
Living people
King Records (Japan) artists
Musicians from Hyōgo Prefecture
21st-century Japanese singers
21st-century Japanese women singers